Harrods Aviation Limited (formerly known as Metro Business Aviation Ltd) is a fixed-base operator and maintenance, repair, and operations service provider for business and corporate aviation in the United Kingdom with bases at London Luton Airport and London Stansted Airport.

See also 
 Air Harrods
 Harrods
 Harrods Estates

References

External links
 

Aviation
Fixed-base operators
Companies based in Essex